Valian (also Romanized as Valīān, Valiyan, Veleyan, Velīān, and Viliān; also known as Vīlau) is a village in Chendar Rural District, Chendar District, Savojbolagh County, Alborz Province, Iran. At the 2006 census, its population was 1,122, in 355 families.

References 

Populated places in Savojbolagh County